Carmencita Ongsiako Reyes (November 9, 1931 – January 7, 2019) was a Filipina politician and jurist. She served as an Assemblywoman from 1985 to 1986, Congresswoman of Marinduque from 1978 to 1998 and 2007 to 2010, as well as governor from 1998 to 2007 and 2010 to her death.

Batasang Pambansa Assemblywoman
Reyes won a seat in the Batasang Pambansa in 1984 under the ruling Kilusang Bagong Lipunan of President Ferdinand Marcos. Reyes was a close ally of the Marcos regime. Her husband, Edmundo M. Reyes, was appointed by President Marcos as the Commissioner on Immigration. Reyes served as an Assemblywoman until the 1986 People Power Revolution, drove Marcos out of power.

References

1931 births
2019 deaths
Governors of Marinduque
People from Marinduque
Kilusang Bagong Lipunan politicians
Lakas–CMD (1991) politicians
Liberal Party (Philippines) politicians
Members of the House of Representatives of the Philippines from Marinduque
Women members of the House of Representatives of the Philippines
University of Santo Tomas alumni
20th-century Filipino women politicians
20th-century Filipino politicians
21st-century Filipino women politicians
21st-century Filipino politicians
Members of the Batasang Pambansa
Women provincial governors of the Philippines
Burials at The Heritage Park